End of the Millennium Psychosis Blues is the third studio album by Irish indie rock band That Petrol Emotion. It was released in 1988, and was the last album with guitarist John O'Neill.
Two singles were released from the album: "Cellophane" and "Groove Check".

Release 

End of the Millennium Psychosis Blues reached No. 53 in the UK Albums Chart.

Track listing

Personnel 
That Petrol Emotion
 Steve Mack –  vocals
 Seán O'Néill –  guitar
 Réamann O'Gorman –  guitar
 Damian O'Neill –  bass, guitar on "Tired Shattered Man"
 Ciaran McLaughlin –  drums, harmonica, guitar on "Groove Check"
Additional musicians
Geraint Watkins –  accordion
Avelia Moisey –  trumpet
Ben Park –  saxophone
Geoff Blythe –  saxophone
Jim Paterson –  trombone
Elana Harris – backing vocals on "The Bottom Line" 
Michele Amar – backing vocals on "The Bottom Line"

References

External links 

 

1988 albums
Albums produced by Roli Mosimann
That Petrol Emotion albums
Virgin Records albums
Albums recorded at Rockfield Studios